Dragon is the eleventh studio album created by the music production company Two Steps from Hell, released on 18 January 2019. It consists of 19 tracks written by composers Thomas J. Bergersen and Nick Phoenix, and features vocal performances by Merethe Soltvedt, Felicia Farerre and Úyanga Bold. Chris Bleth and Claudio Pietronik are also credited for specific instrumental performances. The cover artwork and the sleeve are designed by Steven R. Gilmore.

The group live-streamed the album, intercut with cameos from personnel involved, on Facebook a day before its release. It was watched by 14,000 viewers.

The album peaked at number 2 on the US Classical Albums chart.

Track listing

Critical reception
IFMCA-associated reviews website, MundoBSO, rated it six out of ten stars.

Charts

Weekly charts

Year-end charts

References

External links

2019 albums
Two Steps from Hell albums